Thomas Lau Luen-hung (born 1953) is a Hong Kong business magnate of Teochew descent. He is the chairman and CEO of Lifestyle International Holdings which operates Hong Kong's largest department, Sogo Hong Kong. He is a member of the Twelfth Chinese People's Political Consultative Conference Shanghai Committee and sits on the board of directors for Shanghai Jiao Tong University.

Personal life 
He is the younger brother of billionaire Joseph Lau, the 4th richest man in Hong Kong; and is nicknamed "Younger Lau" to distinguish from Joseph, nicknamed "Elder Lau", whose name is pronounced the same in Cantonese.

His children, Lau Kam Sen and Lau Kam Shim, are executive directors of Lifestyle International Holdings.

References

1953 births
Living people
Hong Kong billionaires
Hong Kong financial businesspeople
Members of the Election Committee of Hong Kong, 2012–2017
Members of the Election Committee of Hong Kong, 2017–2021
University of Toronto alumni
University of Windsor alumni